INS Tarangini is a three-masted barque, commissioned in 1997 as a sail training ship for the Indian Navy. She is square rigged on the fore and main masts and fore-and-aft rigged on the mizzen mast. She was constructed in Goa to a design by the British naval architect Colin Mudie, and launched on 1 December 1995. In 2003–04, she became the first Indian naval ship to circumnavigate the globe.

Apart from races, the ship sails extensively across the Indian Ocean region for the purpose of providing sail training experience to the officer cadets of the Indian Navy. The Indian Navy believes that training on board these ships is the best method of instilling among the trainees the "indefinable 'sea-sense' and respect for elements of nature, which are inseparable from safe and successful seafaring". The Navy believes that sail training also serves to impart the values of courage, camaraderie, endurance and esprit-de-corps among budding naval officers.

Service history
Tarangini started its first circumnavigation of the globe in 2003–04 with the theme of "building bridges of friendship across the oceans". During the fifteen-month voyage, the ship covered  and visited 36 ports in 18 countries. The ship was received by the president, Dr. A. P. J. Abdul Kalam.

In 2003–04, she became the first Indian naval ship to circumnavigate the globe. Since then, Tarangini has sailed to The Great Lakes in Canada for races and has also participated in European tall ship races. Tarangini won The Royal Thames Yacht Club Challenge Trophy in 2005 at Europe and stood third in Youth Sailing Division in 2007 in the USA.

The ship sailed to Europe in 2005 with the aim of ‘strengthening the bridges of friendship across the seas’. She called at 16 ports in 13 countries covering a distance of over 15,000 nautical miles. She participated in the International Fleet Review and International Festival of the Sea at Portsmouth, tall ship races organized by Sail Training International, Sail Bremerhaven and the Sail Amsterdam Sea Festival before returning to India.

On 10 January 2007, Tarangini started another 10-month overseas voyage named "Lokayan 07", calling at 23 ports in 16 countries. The ship departed Kochi on 10 January 2007 and transited through the Suez Canal to reach the Atlantic Coast of North America. It participated in a series of tall ship events such as the World Peace Cup, Maritime Festival of Charleston, Sail Virginia, Sail Rhode Island and Sail Boston and returned to port in October 2007 after covering .

The ship also undertook the Chola Expedition organized by the Maritime History Society of India to retrace the path followed by the Chola seafarers from January to March 2008. The ship called at the ports of Jakarta, Singapore and Phuket during the expedition.

Tarangini flew the Indian flag at the International Fleet Review during the Diamond Jubilee celebrations of the Sri Lanka Navy in December 2010. She was the only tall ship to attend, and was the first ship to be reviewed by Sri Lankan president. The ship stood out during the review with its yards manned by Indian naval cadets and midshipmen of the Sri Lanka Navy.

The value of sail training lies in its ability to foster the virtues of courage, camaraderie, esprit-de-corps and endurance—valued in the Indian Navy for character building. Sailing platforms are suitable for exposing young officers to the challenges at sea to imbibe "sea sense". Whilst under sail, cadets improve their appreciation of the elements to improve their practical experience.

In 2012 INS Sudarshini, built to the same design, was commissioned by the Indian Navy.

In 2015, Tarangini began an eight-month voyage (4 May – 3 December 2015) to participate in the annual tall ship races and other events at Europe, organised under the aegis of Sail Training International. During these eight months, the ship traveled approximately 17,000 miles under sail through the Red Sea, the Mediterranean Sea and the North Sea. She visited 17 ports in 14 countries to showcase India to the world, and demonstrate the Indian Navy's global reach. The theme for the voyage, codenamed LOKAYAN-15, was chosen as "tacking for a broader reach". The tall ship races were conducted primarily off the coast of United Kingdom, Norway, Denmark, Germany and the Netherlands. Tarangini also participated in the tall ship race from Kristiansand, Norway to Aalborg, Denmark. She also participated in associated sail events such as Sail Rostock, Sail Bremerhaven in Germany and Sail Amsterdam in the Netherlands.

In 2018, Tarangini sailed for a seven months sailing expedition Lokayan 2018 from 10 April 18 to 30 October, wherein she participated in ‘Three Festival Tall Ships Regatta’ at Bordeaux (France) and thereafter participated in ‘Tall Ships Races Europe 2018’ from Sunderland (UK) to Esbjerg (Denmark) and Stavanger (Norway) to Harlingen (NL). The ship sailed with a theme ‘Sailing through Different Oceans…Uniting Nations’, covering a distance of about 22,000 Nm spanning over 15 ports across 13 Countries in 3 Continents showcased India to the World, demonstrating Indian Navy's global reach. The ship also sailed for ‘Tall Ships Sail Together’, a joint sailing expedition with her sister ship Sudarshini and Royal Omanian Naval Sailing Ship ‘Zinat-al-Bihar’ from Kochi to Muscat as part of 10th anniversary of IONS in November 2018.

Over the years, the ship has undertaken major expeditions such as Circumnavigation Voyage (2003–04), four LOKAYAN voyages (2005, 2007, 2015 and 2018) and IONS Sailing Expedition 2018. The ship with this illustrious past, has led by example and still strives to imbibe the spirit of adventure and sailing amongst trainees.

 List of Commanding Officers  -  INS Tarangini

Cdr HD Motivala, SC                          11 Nov 97 to 07 Jul 99

Cdr SM Kulkarni                              10 Aug 99 to 25 Apr 01

Cdr S Shaukat Ali                            26 Apr 01 to 31 Aug 03

Cdr PK Garg                                  01 Sep 03 to 11 Feb 04

Cdr Mukul Asthana                            12 Feb 04 to 17 Jul 06

Cdr Sunil Balakrishnan                       18 Jul 06 to 05 Nov 07

Cdr Abhimanyu Patankar                       06 Nov 07 to 31 Jan 10

Cdr Manish Sain                              01 Feb 10 to 07 Dec 11

Cdr Ashwin Arvind                            08 Dec 11 to 10 Aug 12

Cdr T Sugreev                                11 Aug 12  to 29 Dec 13

Cdr Gaurav Gautam                            30 Dec 14 to 17 Oct 15

Cdr Deepak K Subramanian                     18 Oct 15 to 28 Dec 16

Cdr Vidur Chenji                             29 Dec 16 to 28 Dec 17

Cdr Rahul Mehta                              29 Dec 17 to 21 Jan 19

Cdr Dalpat Singh Bhati                       22 Jan 19 to 21 Jan 20

Cdr Rajesh Nag                               22 Jan 20 to until date

Gallery

See also
Training ships of the Indian Navy
INS Sudarshini
School ship

References

External links

Indian Navy – INS Tarangini
Tarangini: Waves Worldwide

Barques of the Indian Navy
Tall ships of India
Training ships of the Indian Navy
Sail training ships
Ships built in India
Naval ships of India
Three-masted ships
Individual sailing vessels
1995 ships
Expeditions from India
Replications of ancient voyages